Johnson v. Arteaga-Martinez, 596 U.S. ___ (2022), was a United States Supreme Court case related to immigration detention.

Background 

Aliens who have been ordered to be deported by immigration courts can be detained by the federal government, pending their removal from the country. The statute that authorizes such detention does not contain a set time limit for the detention, but in Zadvydas v. Davis (2001), the Supreme Court read in a six-month limitation to avoid what it perceived were constitutional issues. Antonio Arteaga-Martinez filed a petition for a writ of habeas corpus in the United States District Court for the Middle District of Pennsylvania, arguing he was detained unlawfully due to the absence of a bond hearing. The district court granted his petition and ordered him released from detention, and after the federal government appealed, the United States Court of Appeals for the Third Circuit summarily affirmed, citing to its previous opinion in Guerrero-Sanchez v. Warden. The government subsequently filed a petition for a writ of certiorari.

Supreme Court 

Certiorari was granted in the case and the companion case Garland v. Gonzalez on August 23, 2021. Oral arguments were held on January 11, 2022. On June 13, 2022, the Supreme Court reversed the Third Circuit in a 8–1 vote, with Justice Sonia Sotomayor writing the majority opinion, Justice Clarence Thomas concurring, and Justice Stephen Breyer concurring in part and dissenting in part.

References

External links 
 

2022 in United States case law
United States Supreme Court cases
United States Supreme Court cases of the Roberts Court
United States immigration and naturalization case law